Olmsted County is a county in the U.S. state of Minnesota. As of the 2020 census, the population is 162,847. Its county seat and most populous city is Rochester.

Olmsted County is part of the Rochester Metropolitan Statistical Area.

History
The Wisconsin Territory was established by the federal government effective July 3, 1836, and existed until its eastern portion was granted statehood (as Wisconsin) in 1848. Therefore, the federal government set up the Minnesota Territory effective March 3, 1849. The newly organized territorial legislature created nine counties across the territory in October of that year. One of those original counties, Wabasha, had portions partitioned off in 1853 to create Fillmore and Rice counties. Then on February 20, 1855, portions of Rice, Wabasha, and Fillmore counties were partitioned off to create the present county, with Rochester (which was also platted that year) as county seat. The county name recognized David Olmsted (1822-1861), a member of the first territorial council and the first mayor of St. Paul.

The county boundaries have remained unchanged since 1855.

Geography
Olmsted County is a fairly unusual mix of urban and rural areas in that there's no transition or buffer between the two environments. Rochester, Minnesota's third largest city of roughly 118,000 people, sits in the Zumbro River valley at the center of the county.  Outside the valley however, with the exception of a small amount of urban growth in the last few years, remains farmland with small agricultural based communities and no directly adjacent suburbs. Stewartville, the county's second largest city, is slightly over 1/20th the size at roughly 6,000 people, an unusually large gap for a metropolitan area.

Olmsted County is drained by three rivers, all flowing to the Mississippi. The Zumbro River flows northward through the west central part of the county, into Wabasha County. The Whitewater flows northeast from the northeast part of the county into Winona County, and the Root flows east-southeastward through the lower part of the county into Fillmore County. The county terrain consists of low rolling hills, etched by drainage gullies and marked by occasional buttes. The available area is devoted to agriculture or is developed for other productive uses. The county terrain slopes to the east and north, and its highest point is a hill 7.5 miles (12 km) west of Stewartville, at 1,380' (421m) ASL. It is one of four counties in Minnesota that does not have any natural lakes (the other three being Mower, Pipestone, and Rock).

Transit
 Jefferson Lines
 Rochester Public Transit

Major highways

  Interstate 90
  U.S. Highway 14
  U.S. Highway 52
  U.S. Highway 63
  Minnesota State Highway 30
  Minnesota State Highway 42
  Minnesota State Highway 74
  Minnesota State Highway 247
  Olmsted County Highway 22

Airports
 Mid-Continent Airport
 Rochester International Airport (RST)

Adjacent counties

 Wabasha County - north
 Winona County - east
 Fillmore County - south
 Mower County - southwest
 Dodge County - west
 Goodhue County - northwest

Protected areas

 Chester Woods Park
 High Forest Wildlife Management Area
 Keller Wildlife Management Area
 Marian Marshall Wildlife Management Area
 Nelson Fen Wildlife Management Area
 Oronoco Scientific and Natural Area
 Oxbow Park & Zollman Zoo
 Root River Park
 Schumann State Wildlife Management Area
 Suess State Wildlife Management Area
 Whitewater Wildlife Management Area (part)

Lakes
Though Olmsted County does not have any natural lakes, it does have six reservoirs created by dams:
 Chester Lake: Eyota Township
 Lake Florence: High Forest Township
 Lake George: Rochester Township
 Mayowood Lake: Rochester Township
 Silver Lake: Haverhill Township and Cascade Township
 Lake Zumbro (part): Oronoco Township

Demographics

2020 census
As of the census of 2020, the population was 162,847. The racial makeup of the county was 77.8% White, 6.8% Black or African American, 6.3% Asian, 0.4% Native American, 0.1% Pacific Islander, 2.5% from other races, and 6.1% from two or more races. Ethnically, the population was 5.6% Hispanic or Latino of any race.

2000 census

As of the 2000 United States census, there were 124,277 people, 47,807 households, and 32,317 families  in the county. The population density was 190/sqmi (73.5/km2). There were 49,422 housing units at an average density of 75.7/sqmi (29.2/km2). The racial makeup of the county was 90.33% White, 2.68% Black or African American, 0.26% Native American, 4.27% Asian, 0.03% Pacific Islander, 0.92% from other races, and 1.51% from two or more races. 2.38% of the population were Hispanic or Latino of any race.

There were 47,807 households, out of which 35.20% had children under the age of 18 living with them, 56.70% were married couples living together, 8.00% had a female householder with no husband present, and 32.40% were non-families. 25.80% of all households were made up of individuals, and 7.60% had someone living alone who was 65 years of age or older. The average household size was 2.53 and the average family size was 3.09.

The county population contained 27.00% under the age of 18, 8.50% from 18 to 24, 32.20% from 25 to 44, 21.60% from 45 to 64, and 10.80% who were 65 years of age or older. The median age was 35 years. For every 100 females, there were 96.60 males. For every 100 females age 18 and over, there were 93.60 males.

The median income for a household in the county was $51,316, and the median income for a family was $61,610. Males had a median income of $40,196 versus $29,994 for females. The per capita income for the county was $24,939. About 3.80% of families and 6.40% of the population were below the poverty line, including 6.70% of those under age 18 and 9.50% of those age 65 or over.

Politics
Olmsted has historically been a Republican-leaning county. However, rapid population growth in Rochester has made it more competitive in recent years. In 2020, Joe Biden won it by nearly 11 points, the best performance of any Democrat since Lyndon Johnson in 1964. Since 2000, Olmsted County has voted for the winning presidential candidate in five of the six elections. The exception is 2016, where national electoral winner Donald Trump lost Olmsted County by less than one percent.

Although it has trended Democratic at the presidential level, Olmsted County continues to lean Republican in state and local races, with split ticket voting becoming more common locally. Two of the county's three seats in the Minnesota Senate are held by Republicans, as well as two of the five seats in the Minnesota House of Representatives. Since 1970, Olmsted County has only voted for the DFL candidate for governor twice: in 1974 and 2018. In 2018, then-Representative Tim Walz benefitted from high recognition in the district with a reputation at the time of being a moderate politician. Despite Walz winning a majority of the county's vote that election, Republican candidate Doug Wardlow concurrently won the greatest number of votes in Olmsted County in the 2018 Minnesota Attorney General election.

US House of Representatives

Minnesota Senate

Minnesota House of Representatives

Communities

Cities

 Byron
 Chatfield (part)
 Dover
 Eyota
 Oronoco
 Pine Island (part)
 Rochester (county seat)
 Stewartville

Unincorporated communities

 Chester
 Cummingsville
 Danesville (part)
 Douglas
 Genoa
 High Forest
 Judge
 Marion
 Pleasant Grove
 Post Town
 Potsdam
 Predmore
 Ringe
 Rock Dell
 Salem Corners
 Shanty Town
 Simpson
 Viola

Townships

 Cascade Township
 Dover Township
 Elmira Township
 Eyota Township
 Farmington Township
 Haverhill Township
 High Forest Township
 Kalmar Township
 Marion Township
 New Haven Township
 Orion Township
 Oronoco Township
 Pleasant Grove Township
 Quincy Township
 Rochester Township
 Rock Dell Township
 Salem Township
 Viola Township

See also
 National Register of Historic Places listings in Olmsted County, Minnesota

References

External links

 County website

 
Minnesota counties
Rochester metropolitan area, Minnesota
1855 establishments in Minnesota Territory
Populated places established in 1855